The CBU Events Center is a sports arena in Riverside, California. It opened in 2017 and has a capacity of 5,050.

The 153,000-square-feet facility is home to the Cal Baptist Lancers men's and women's basketball teams as well as select matches for the women's volleyball and men's wrestling teams. The arena replaced Van Dyne Gym for men's and women's basketball as part of the Lancers' transition to Division I. The women's volleyball team and men's wrestling team use Van Dyne Gym as their main venue.

In addition to athletic events, the arena also hosts CBU's chapel program, student orientation activities and commencement ceremonies.

Gallery

See also
 List of NCAA Division I basketball arenas

References

Basketball venues in California
Volleyball venues in California
Wrestling venues in California
California Baptist Lancers sports venues
College basketball venues in the United States
College volleyball venues in the United States
College wrestling venues in the United States
Indoor arenas in California
Sports venues in Riverside, California
Sports venues completed in 2017
2017 establishments in California